In chemistry, a lyate ion is the anion derived by the deprotonation of a solvent molecule. For example, a hydroxide ion is formed by the deprotonation of water, and methoxide is the anion formed by the deprotonation of methanol.

Its counterpart is a lyonium ion, the cation formed by the protonation of a solvent molecule.

Lyonium and lyate ions, resulting from molecular autoionization, contribute to the molar conductivity of protolytic solvents.

Examples

See also
Lyonium ion, a protonated solvent molecule
Ate complex
Ion transport number
Ionic atmosphere

References

Anions
Bases (chemistry)